The following political parties, listed in alphabetic order, have taken part in recent elections for the Palestinian National Authority in the Palestinian territories:

Brief history and overview 
In 1994, The Palestinian Authority was formed, the governing body for the interim period pending final status negotiations. The President of the State of Palestine is the highest-ranking political position, the equivalent to head of state, in the Palestinian National Authority (PNA). The President is elected by popular elections. The Palestinian Legislative Council is the legislature of the Palestinian Authority. It is not to be confused with the Palestine National Council, which remains the national legislature of the Palestinian people as a whole. The PLC passed a new law in June 2005 increasing the number of MPs from 88 to 132, stipulating that half be elected under a system of proportional representation and half by traditional constituencies.

Legislative Council members

Unrepresented parties

Alliances

Defunct parties

See also
 Politics of the Palestinian National Authority
 List of political parties by country

References

 
Palestine
Political parties

Palestine
Political parties